Pinkerton Ross Vaughn, Sr. (1841 – August 22, 1866) was a United States Marine Corps sergeant during the American Civil War. He was awarded the nation's highest military decoration for valor—the Medal of Honor, for his actions aboard the  during a battle with Confederate artillery batteries at Port Hudson, Louisiana on March 14, 1863. Vaughn is one of the first two Marines to be awarded the Medal of Honor in the history of the Marine Corps.

Biography
Vaughn was born in Downingtown, Pennsylvania in 1841 (alternate birth year: 1839), the son of Matthew Vaughn (1804–1874) and Ann Vaughn (1804–1893).

He enlisted for military service as his nation was descending into secession and civil war. After enrolling in Philadelphia in October 1860, Vaughn officially mustered in with the U.S. Marine Corps at the Marine Barracks in Philadelphia on October 31. During his service, he obtained the rank of sergeant and served aboard the USS Tennessee and USS Mississippi. The steam-powered and 17-gun warship USS Mississippi was part of the U.S. Navy fleet commanded by Admiral David Farragut that battled with Confederate artillery batteries on March 14–15, 1863, shortly before and prelude to, the Union army's battle and siege of Port Hudson, Louisiana. On July 10, 1863, Vaughn was awarded the Medal of Honor (Navy version) for his actions during the night of March 14 aboard the Mississippi. He was "commended for zeal and courage displayed in the performance of unusual and trying service while the vessel was aground and exposed to a heavy fire". He was honorably discharged in Philadelphia on November 7, 1864. Vaughn and Sergeant John Mackie were the first Marines to be awarded the Medal of Honor.

Vaughn returned home to Pennsylvania after he was discharged, and secured work as a brakeman with a trolley company in Philadelphia. On May 18, 1865, he married Elizabeth A. Getty (1840–1903) in Philadelphia. A native of New Jersey, she was a daughter of Andrew and Ann Getty. Their only child, Pinkerton Ross Vaughn, Jr. (1866–1913), was born in February 1866. On August 22, 1866, Vaughn was severely injured in a trolley car accident and died later that day. He was laid to rest at Philadelphia's Laurel Hill Cemetery on August 27. The West Chester Village Record reported on his death as follows:

 
Fatal Accident - On Wednesday, the 22nd, while the 3d stock train on the Penna. rail road was going east, one of the brakemen named Pinkerton R. Vaughn, was struck on the head by an overhead Bridge west of City Avenue, causing death in about 40 minutes. He was 25 years old and leaves a wife and one child. He was buried from his late residence 32d and Bearing st. West Philadelphia. Mr. Vaughn served all through the war in the navy and received a medal of honor from the War Department for bravery while in action. It seems hard that he should meet so untimely a death. M.S. Chalfount of West Chester was the conductor on the train. The parents of the deceased reside at Downingtown.

Vaughn's widow, Elizabeth, died in Camden, New Jersey on December 26, 1903. She was laid to rest beside her deceased husband at the Laurel Hill Cemetery in Philadelphia. Pinkerton Ross Vaughn, Jr. died from tuberculosis at the Almshouse Hospital in Blackwood, New Jersey, on December 24, 1913, at the age of 47. He was laid to rest in the same cemetery.

Medal of Honor citation
 Vaughn's Medal of Honor citation reads:

Rank and organization: Sergeant, U.S. Marine Corps.
Born: 1839, Downingtown, Pa.
Accredited to: Pennsylvania.
G.O. No: 17, 10 July 1863.

Citation:

Serving on board the U.S.S. Mississippi during her abandonment and firing in the action with the Port Hudson batteries, 14 March 1863. During the abandonment of the Mississippi which had to be grounded, Sergeant Vaughn rendered invaluable assistance to his commanding officer, remaining with the ship until all the crew had landed and the ship had been fired to prevent its falling into enemy hands. Persistent until the last, and conspicuously cool under the heavy shellfire, Sergeant Vaughn was finally ordered to save himself as he saw fit.

See also

List of Medal of Honor recipients
Pennsylvania in the American Civil War

References

1841 births
1866 deaths
United States Marine Corps Medal of Honor recipients
United States Marines
Union Marines
People of Pennsylvania in the American Civil War
People from Downingtown, Pennsylvania
American Civil War recipients of the Medal of Honor
Burials at Laurel Hill Cemetery (Philadelphia)
Road incident deaths in Pennsylvania